Remember Pearl Harbor is a 1942 American propaganda film directed by Joseph Santley and written by Malcolm Stuart Boylan and Isabel Dawn. The film stars Don "Red" Barry, Alan Curtis, Fay McKenzie, Sig Ruman, Ian Keith and Rhys Williams. Remember Pearl Harbor was released on May 18, 1942, by Republic Pictures.

Plot
On November 16, 1941 at the La Dessa U. S. army post in the Philippines, a Japanese aircraft carrier off the coast transmits a coded message to the contraband radio of Nazi spies who stick the message in a bottle of German liquor called Kümmel. The message states a Japanese battleship is approaching Pearl Harbor, Private Steve "Lucky" Smith (Don "Red" Barry) meets his fellow soldiers Bruce Gordon (Alan Curtis) and "Portly" Porter (Maynard Holmes) in the Casa Marina bar, where Lucky and Steve try to attract Portly's sister, Marcia (Fay McKenzie). Portly arranges for Marcia to be the secretary to Andy L. Anderson (Rhys Williams), the owner of the bar. A businessman named Littlefield (Robert Emmett Keane) slips into Marcia's booth to read the message in the Kümmel bottle. Lucky comes to her defence by attacking Littlefield, with Bruce and Portly joining the fight.

Captain Hudson (Ian Keith) orders the soldiers to find the spy's radio. Though Lucky is in charge, he soon returns to the bar to find Marcia. Bruce and Portly, meanwhile, pick up a coded radio transmission from a Japanese boat and follow the beam to Littlefield's hideout. A gunfight erupts where Portly is killed and Littlefield escapes. When Lucky later admits to the captain that he was not there, the captain court-martials him and promotes Bruce to corporal. Lucky escapes from jail and soon after, Anderson, one of the spies, meets with Van Hoorten (Sig Ruman), another Nazi posing as a Dutch Indian. They discuss a plan to stockpile ammunition and gas for the Japanese troops who will invade.

Anderson is to kill Littlefield and arrange for the gas to be transported to their warehouse, but when Lucky turns to Anderson for help, Anderson slyly tips him off to Littlefield's hideout. That night, Lucky attacks Littlefield but Anderson shoots him, then gives Lucky the job of transporting some "crude oil" to his warehouse.

On the way, Bruce stops Lucky's truck and asks him to turn himself in. At the warehouse, Lucky realizes that his cargo is gasoline. Marcia and Lucky sneak into Van Hoorten's office that night and find ammunition and a Nazi flag. Van Hoorten bursts in and Lucky shoots him.

Bruce, who has tracked Lucky to the warehouse, hears a radio announcement that Pearl Harbor has been bombed. Before the three can leave, Japanese aircraft land nearby and the soldiers enter the office with Anderson. The three Americans escape, find a radio and send Captain Hudson a message for help.

When the American troops arrive, Hudson spots another Japanese aircraft carrier in the bay. Lucky courageously saves the Americans by flying a Japanese aircraft into the carrier in a suicide mission. Bruce receives a Distinguished Service Cross while Marcia collects the award on Lucky's behalf.

Cast   
 Don "Red" Barry as Pvt. Steve "Lucky" Smith 
 Alan Curtis as Bruce Gordon
 Fay McKenzie as Marcia Porter
 Sig Ruman as Dirk Van Hoorten
 Ian Keith as Capt. Hudson
 Rhys Williams as Señor "Andy" Anderson
 Maynard Holmes as Pvt. "Portly" Porter
 Diana Del Rio as Doralda
 Robert Emmett Keane as Mr. Littlefield
 Sammy Stein as MP Sgt. Adams
 Paul Fung as Japanese Bartender
 James B. Leong as Japanese Major

Production
Principal photography on Remember Pearl Harbor, took place from March 12 to April 6, 1942.

Reception
Reviewer Herbert Cohn of the Brooklyn Daily Eagle wrote:
"Remember Pearl Harbor" underneath its title, is a phony. It isn't about Pearl Harbor at all. ... [It is] about fifth columnists in the Philippines, a few thousand miles west of Pearl Harbor. And it isn't even a good picture about fifth columnists. It is pokey, except when the Japanese arrive toward the end and the army garrison at Manilla comes to life to be trapped by them.
Bosley Crowther in his review of Remember Pearl Harbor for The New York Times, despaired,"Pearl Harbor is something to remember, but Republic's 'Remember Pearl Harbor' definitely is not. For this cheap little action drama, which popped into Loew's Criterion yesterday, has nothing to recommend it save its title, nothing in the way of a story that isn't old. ."

References

Notes

Citations

Bibliography

 Koppes, Clayton R. and Gregory D. Black. Hollywood Goes to War: How Politics, Profits and Propaganda Shaped World War II Movies. New York: The Free Press, 1987. .
 Pendo, Stephen. Aviation in the Cinema. Lanham, Maryland: Scarecrow Press, 1985. .

External links
 
 
 
 

1942 films
1940s war drama films
American aviation films
American black-and-white films
American war drama films
American World War II propaganda films
1940s English-language films
Films directed by Joseph Santley
Films set in the Philippines
Pacific War films
Pearl Harbor films
Republic Pictures films
Japan in non-Japanese culture